This is a summary of the seven seasons of Melrose Place, an American prime-time soap opera which was broadcast on Fox from 1992 to 1999. In 2004, Soapnet began repeating the series, and all episodes have been released on DVD.

Season one: 1992-1993

Season two: 1993-1994

Season three: 1994-1995

Season four: 1995-1996

Season five: 1996-1997

Season six: 1997-1998

Season seven: 1998-1999

References

American television soap operas